The Treaty of Troyes was an agreement that King Henry V of England and his heirs would inherit the French throne upon the death of King Charles VI of France. It was formally signed in the French city of Troyes on 21 May 1420 in the aftermath of Henry's successful military campaign in France. It forms a part of the backdrop of the latter phase of the Hundred Years' War finally won by the French at the Battle of Castillon in 1453, and in which various English kings tried to establish their claims to the French throne.

Terms

The treaty arranged for the marriage of Charles VI's daughter Catherine of Valois to Henry V, who was made regent of France and acknowledged (along with his future sons) as successor to the French throne. The Dauphin Charles VII of France was disinherited from the succession. The Estates-General of France ratified the agreement later that year after Henry V entered Paris.

Background
The French king Charles VI suffered bouts of insanity through much of his reign. Henry V had invaded France in 1415 and delivered a crushing defeat to the French at Agincourt. In 1418, John the Fearless, Duke of Burgundy, whose political and economic interests favoured an agreement with the English, occupied Paris. One year later he was murdered by his Armagnac opponents during what he thought was a diplomatic meeting with the Dauphin Charles on the bridge at Montereau. His son Philip the Good formed an alliance with the English and negotiated the treaty with the English King.

Isabeau of Bavaria, Charles VI's wife, whose participation in the negotiations was merely formal, agreed to the treaty disinheriting her son, hoping that if the dynasties were joined through Henry V the war could be ended and leave France in the hands of a vigorous and able king.

There had been earlier rumours that the Queen had had an affair with her brother-in-law Louis, Duke of Orléans. These rumours were gladly taken up by Louis's main rival, John the Fearless, who had had the Duke of Orléans assassinated in 1407. The Burgundians promoted the rumour that Charles was a bastard. However, such a statement could not possibly be registered in a treaty without offending the honour of the King of France. Thus, the disinheritance of the dauphin, with respect to the French throne, was based on his crimes énormes (capital offences) as he was accused of having ordered the assassination of John the Fearless.

The legal basis for the treaty was from the beginning on questionably solid ground, as only the King himself would have the authority to make such an all-important decision as terminating his own Royal House, and Charles, called "the mad", was indisputably not of mental capacity to enter into such an agreement, as most of his entire reign was overseen by regents for that very reason (the four universal legal tenets for any valid contract being consideration, agreement, legality, and capacity). Despite this, due to the shifting military and political situation, the Dauphin Charles' disinheritance received further legal sanction after he declared himself regent for Charles VI in rivalry to the regency declared by Henry V. The Dauphin was summoned to a lit-de justice (legal hearing) in 1420 on charges of lèse-majesté.  When he failed to appear, a Parisian court in 1421 found Charles the Dauphin guilty of treason and sentenced him to disinheritance and banishment from the Kingdom of France, losing all privileges to land and titles.

Aftermath
The treaty was undermined by the deaths of both Charles VI and Henry V within two months of each other in 1422. The infant Henry VI of England became King of both England and France, but the Dauphin Charles also claimed the throne of France upon the death of his father – though he ruled only a region of France centred on Bourges and was derisively referred to as the "King of Bourges" by his opponents.

The terms of the Treaty of Troyes were later confirmed once again at the Treaty of Amiens (1423), when Burgundy and Brittany confirmed the recognition of Henry VI as King of France and agreed to form a triple-defensive alliance against the Dauphin Charles. The course of the war shifted dramatically in 1429, however, following the appearance of Joan of Arc to command the Valois forces. They lifted the siege of Orléans and then fought their way to Reims, traditional site of French coronations, where the former Dauphin was crowned as Charles VII of France. In 1435, Charles signed the Treaty of Arras with the Burgundians, in which they recognized and endorsed his claims to the throne.

The military victory of Charles VII over Henry VI rendered the treaty moot. A final attempt at the French throne was made by Edward IV of England in 1475, but he agreed to peace with Louis XI in the Treaty of Picquigny. The kings of England continued to nominally claim the crown of France until 1801, though this was never again seriously pursued. Their last territory on the French mainland, the city of Calais, was lost to France in 1558.

References

1420 in England
Troyes
Troyes
Troyes
1420s in France
1420s treaties
Troyes
Hundred Years' War, 1415–1453
Henry V of England